The Nova Scotia U18 Major Hockey League (NSU18MHL, formerly NSMMHL) is a  Nova Scotian ice hockey league for Major AAA players under 18 years old. It is a part of and follows the regulations set by the Hockey Nova Scotia organisation. Successful players in this league often go on to play in the  MHL and QMJHL.

History
The league was founded and began playing in the 1978-79 season as the Maritime Midget Hockey League. During the first season there were 7 teams in the league with 4 based in Nova Scotia and 3 based in New Brunswick. Since its founding the league has rebranded multiple times, first as the Nova Scotia AAA Midget Hockey League (NSAAAMHL) in 1983, then as the Nova Scotia Major Midget Hockey League (NSMMHL) in 2002, and finally as the Nova Scotia U18 Major Hockey League in 2019. It was founded to offer an opportunity for under 18 players from the Maritimes to compete at the highest possible level for their age group, with many associations spinning off their AAA teams to play in the broader Nova Scotia league.

Teams

League Champions
During the regular season the league tracks the teams with the most wins who then go on to compete in the league finals for the champion title.

For the 2019-20 and 2020-21 seasons no league champion was crowned due to the finals being cancelled by COVID-19 pandemic related lock-downs.

Notable Players
 Morgan Barron
 Shane Bowers
 Sidney Crosby
 Ryan Graves
 Nathan MacKinnon
 Brad Marchand
 Glen Murray
 Logan Shaw
 James Sheppard

External links
NSU18MHL Website

References

Ice hockey leagues in Nova Scotia
Ice hockey leagues in New Brunswick
Organizations based in Nova Scotia
Nova Scotia